Drawback may refer to:

 Drawback, a type of refund in the United States
 Drawback (album), a 1996 album by X Marks the Pedwalk
 Drawback, the withdrawal of water following or preceding a tsunami

See also

 
 
 disadvantage
 disadvantaged
 Weakness (disambiguation)

he:הישבון